Mont Ross is a stratovolcano, the highest mountain in the Kerguelen Islands at . It is located in the Gallieni Massif, at the end of the Gallieni Peninsula, east of Baie Larose on the main island of Grande Terre. The volcano is composed primarily of trachybasalt and was active during the late Pleistocene.

History
Mont Ross was named after explorer Sir James Clark Ross. The first human being to set foot on its summit was French military engineer Henri Journoud, using a helicopter, in the early 1960s. The mountain was, however, first climbed in 1975 by Jean Afanassieff and Patrick Cordier, the last French mountain to be climbed.

Photos

See also
 List of Ultras of Oceania
 List of islands by highest point

References

External links
 Global Volcanism Program: Kerguelen Islands

Landforms of the Kerguelen Islands
Stratovolcanoes of France
Pleistocene stratovolcanoes
Volcanoes of the French Southern and Antarctic Lands